Sarbine flavodiscalis is a species of moth of the family Erebidae, subfamily Arctiinae. It is found in Borneo and Peninsular Malaysia. It is found in montane forests between 1,050 and 1,930 meters.

External links
The Moths of Borneo

Nudariina
Moths of Asia
Moths described in 1926